Vincent Regan (born 16 May 1965) is a British film and television actor, best known for his roles in 300, Troy, Unleashed, Clash of the Titans and Lockout.

Early life
Regan was born on 16 May 1965 in Swansea, Glamorgan, Wales, UK, the son of Irish immigrants. As a youth, he moved to Ireland with his parents, but moved to England and attended St Joseph's College, Ipswich, Suffolk, before attending the Academy of Live and Recorded Arts in London.

Acting career
Regan first came on UK TV screens in series 5 (1992) of LWT's London's Burning, playing Don, the love interest of Firefighter Kate Stevens (Samantha Beckinsale). That same year he played PC Shelby alongside Sir David Jason’s DI Jack Frost in the (TV series) [A Touch of Frost].
Regan has over 15 stage roles to his credit, most recently as Achilles in Troilus and Cressida at the Edinburgh International Festival. In association with the Royal Shakespeare Company, the festival presented director Peter Stein's strongly cast and visually striking production. He is best known for Ancient Greece-based films 300, in which he played the Captain, Troy, where he played Eudorus, Achilles' second in command, and Clash of the Titans, in which he played King Cepheus.

In 1999, Regan received an Irish Best Actor nomination for his co-starring performance in the award-winning miniseries Eureka Street.

In 2006–07, he guest starred in two episodes of Wild at Heart as Simon Adams, father of Danny Trevannion's (Stephen Tompkinson) stepchildren Olivia and Evan.

In 2012, Regan announced his intention to launch a theatre company in Beverley, Yorkshire, along with Judi Dench and other professional actors. That year, he appeared in films such as Outside Bet, Lockout, and Snow White and the Huntsman.

Regan is also a screenwriter and director, developing projects for his own film company. His script, Come Like Shadows, is an accessible but classic interpretation of Macbeth headlining Sean Bean and Tilda Swinton and will be directed by John Maybury. He also appeared briefly as a sexually confused character in British series The Street.

In 2013, he guest starred in the first episode of Series 10 of New Tricks.

He played the Duke of Savoy in the 4th episode of the BBC series The Musketeers in 2014.

Regan joined the cast of the BBC's Atlantis as Dion for series 2 starting November 2014.

He starred as King Simon in E!'s The Royals.

Regan has acted in three films set in Ancient Greece: Troy, 300 and Clash of the Titans, and the Ancient Greece-based TV series Atlantis.

Filmography

Televisión

References

External links

1965 births
Living people
People educated at St Joseph's College, Ipswich
Welsh male film actors
Welsh male television actors
Male actors from Swansea
Welsh people of Irish descent
Alumni of the Academy of Live and Recorded Arts
20th-century Welsh male actors
21st-century Welsh male actors
Welsh male stage actors